Gunnar Andreassen (5 January 1913 – 23 July 2002) was a Norwegian football player and manager. He played on Fredrikstad FK from 1933 to 1950, except during the World War II German occupation of Norway. He appeared twice on the Norway national team, in 1939 (the last international competition before occupation) and 1945 (the first competition following the end of occupation). Andreassen managed Fredrikstad from 1953 to 1956 and Østsiden IL from 1959 to 1962.

References

External links
Gunnar Andreassen at FFKsupporter.net

1913 births
2002 deaths
Fredrikstad FK players
Norway international footballers
Norwegian footballers
Norwegian football managers
Fredrikstad FK managers
1938 FIFA World Cup players

Association football midfielders